2022–23 Hong Kong Senior Challenge Shield is the 119th season of the Hong Kong Senior Shield. 10 teams entered this edition, with 2 games being played in the First Round before the quarter-finals stage. The competition was only open to teams that played in the 2022–23 Hong Kong Premier League.

The champions received HK$150,000 in prize money while the runners up received HK$50,000. The best player of the final received a HK$10,000 bonus. In addition, the two losing teams in semi-finals received HK$20,000 while the remaining teams received HK$5,000.

Eastern were the defending champions but lost to Kitchee in the final. Kitchee became the champions for the 8th time after beating Eastern in the final.

Calendar

Bracket

Bold = winner
* = after extra time, = penalty shootout score

Fixtures and results

First round

Quarter-finals

Semi-finals

Final

Final

Top scorers

References

External links

2022-23
2022–23 in Hong Kong football
2022–23 domestic association football cups